The HP-30 or Spice series are  RPN Scientific hand held calculators introduced by Hewlett Packard in 1978. Some models are a programmable.

Overview
Perhaps the HP-30 series, Spice, was to be released as a replacement for the aging HP-20 series. It has no expandability. The display provided better readability by increasing the digit size and adding commas.

The entry-level was the HP-31E and 32E, that were not programmable;  but even the 31E provided a Self-check.

The HP-37E and 38E/C were the financial models of the Spice series.

The battery of these calculators can be changed without using tools. The housing is closed by screws.

Programming
The HP-33E/C (49 steps plus subroutines) and HP-34C (70 steps) and 38E/C (99 steps) are programmable, the C-models have a permanent memory.

The production of the 31E ended in 1980, production of the other Spice models ended in 1983. As this calculator is regarded amongst the very good in terms of quality, key stroke feel and daily usability for engineers.

Features
 All basic scientific functions
 Statistics (HP-32E, HP-37E, HP-38E/C)
 Numerical integration (HP-34C)
 Programmability (keystroke programming with branching, loops, tests and flags)

See also
 HP-34C
 HP calculators
 List of Hewlett-Packard pocket calculators

References

External links
 Third Generation of HP Calculators (1978) on hpmuseum.org
 HP-30 series description on thimet.de
 

30 series
33E
Computer-related introductions in 1978